The 2016–17 Honduran Liga Nacional de Ascenso is the 38th edition of the second level tournament in Honduran football and the 15th since its re-branding as Liga de Ascenso.  As the previous season, the tournament will be divided into two phases named Apertura (fall) and Clausura (spring), the winners of each phase will fight for the promotion to the 2017–18 Honduran Liga Nacional.

2016–17 teams
For the first time, there will be 32 teams divided into 4 groups of eight.

Group A
 Victoria (Relegated from 2015–16 Honduran Liga Nacional)
 Arsenal
 Yoro
 Trujillo
 Tela F.C.
 Boca Júnior
 CARDVA
 Discua Nicolás (Promoted from 2015–16 Honduran Liga Mayor)

Group B
 Deportes Savio
 Real Juventud
 Olimpia Occidental
 Lepaera
 Atlético Esperanzano
 Atlético Pinares

Group C
 Parrillas One
 Atlético Choloma
 Atlético Municipal
 Atlético Independiente
 Villanueva
 Comayagua
 Atlético Limeño
 Brasilia

Group D
 Lobos UPNFM
 Olancho
 Valle
 Municipal Valencia
 Gimnástico
 Estrella Roja (Promoted from 2015–16 Honduran Liga Mayor)

Apertura
The Apertura tournament will run from 19 August to December 2016.

Final

Clausura
The Clausura tournament will run from January to May 2017.

Playoffs

Quarterfinals

 UPNFM won 1–0 on aggregated.

 Olancho won 3–1 on aggregated.

 Lepaera won 3–1 on aggregated.

 Villanueva won 7–3 on aggregated.

Semifinals

 Lepaera 2–2 UPNFM on aggregated.  UPNFM won 4–1 on penalty shoot-outs.

 Villanueva won 2–1 on aggregated.

Final

Promotion
The winners of both Apertura and Clausura tournaments will face to decide the team to be promoted to 2017–18 Honduran Liga Nacional.  In case the same team wins both phases, it will obtain automatic promotion.  Lepaera F.C. and Lobos UPNFM as Apertura and Clausura winners respectively will fight for promotion.

References

2016–17 in Honduran football
Honduran Liga Nacional de Ascenso seasons